Astrocyanite-(Ce) is a bright blue mineral with the chemical formula . Its type locality is Kamoto East Open Cut, Kamoto, Kolwezi, Lualaba, Congo

References

External links 

 Astrocyanite-(Ce) data sheet
 About Astrocyanite-(Ce
 Astrocyanite-(Ce) on the Handbook of Mineralogy

Copper(II) minerals
Neodymium compounds
Lanthanide minerals
Uranium(VI) minerals
Oxygen compounds
Carbonate minerals
Hydroxide minerals
Hydrates
Minerals described in 1990